The Cordillera Paine is a mountain group in Torres del Paine National Park in Chilean Patagonia. It belongs to the Commune of Torres del Paine in Última Esperanza Province of Magallanes and Antártica Chilena Region. No accurate surveys have been published, and published elevations have been claimed to be seriously inflated, so most of the elevations given on this page are approximate. Paine means "blue" in the native Tehuelche (Aonikenk) language and is pronounced PIE-nay.

Peaks

The highest summit of the range is Cerro Paine Grande. For a long time its elevation was claimed to be , but in August 2011 it was ascended for the third time, measured using GPS and found to be .

The three Towers of Paine form the centrepiece of Parque Nacional Torres del Paine. It was first climbed in 1963 by Armando Aste.

Geology

The range is made up of a yellowish granite underlain by grey gabbro-diorite laccolith and the sedimentary rocks it intrudes, deeply eroded by glaciers. The steep, light colored faces are eroded  from the tougher, vertically jointed granitic rocks, while the foothills and dark cap rocks are the sedimentary country rock, in this case flysch deposited in the Cretaceous and later folded.

The radiometric age for the quartz diorite at Cerro Paine is 12±2 million years by the rubidium-strontium method and 13±1 million years by the potassium-argon method. More precise ages of 12.59±0.02 and 12.50±0.02 million years for the earliest and latest identified phases of the intrusion, respectively, were achieved using Uranium–lead dating methods on single zircon crystals. Basal gabbro and diorite were dated by a similar technique to 12.472±0.009 to 12.431±0.006 million years. Thus, magma was intruded and crystallized over 162±11 thousand years. High resolution dating and excellent 3-D exposure of the laccolith and its vertical feeding system allow detailed reconstruction of the Torres del Paine fossil magma chamber history.

Hiking

The Torres del Paine National Park—an area of —was declared a Biosphere Reserve by the UNESCO in 1978 and receives about 250,000 visitors annually. Trails and some campsites are maintained by Chile's National Forest Corporation, and mountain huts provide shelter and basic services.

See also
 Fitz Roy
 Los Glaciares National Park

References

Biggar, John, 2015. The Andes: A Guide for Climbers (4th edition).
Kearney, Alan, 1993. Mountaineering in Patagonia.  Seattle USA: Cloudcap.

External links

Complete description of Torres del Paine in Andeshandbook
x666AFSFASDDFFA   Patagonia Webcam and maps from Paine
Torres del Paine on summitpost
Torres del Paine Circuit Planning
Photograph of the cordillera from Estero Última Esperanza, 50 km to the south

Mountain ranges of Chile
Última Esperanza Province
Landforms of Magallanes Region
Miocene magmatism
Torres del Paine National Park